Atlètic Terrassa Hockey Club, also known as Atlètic Terrassa, is a field hockey club based in Terrassa, Catalonia, Spain. The club was founded in 1952. Their senior men's field hockey team play in the División de Honor and the Copa del Rey. They have also regularly represented Spain in the Euro Hockey League.  Their senior women's field hockey team play in the División de Honor and in the Copa de la Reina. In addition to field hockey, the club also organises teams in various other sports and activities including tennis, padel, basketball, futsal, swimming, gymnastics and golf.

History
Atlètic Terrassa was founded in 1952. They won their first División de Honor title in 1982–83 and subsequently went onto win nine consecutive titles between then and 1990–91. Between 2003–04 and 2011–12 they won the División de Honor eight seasons out of nine. Atlètic won their first Copa del Rey in 1983–84 and subsequently went onto win five consecutive tournaments between then and 1987–88. In 2014–15 they won their 16th Copa del Rey after defeating Real Club de Polo in a penalty shoot-out.

Euro Hockey League
Atlètic Terrassa have regularly represented Spain in the Euro Hockey League. Their best performance in the competition was in 2021 when they finished second.

Can Salas
Atlètic Terrassa are based at Can Salas, located near Sant Llorenç del Munt and bordering  Terrassa, Sabadell, Matadepera and Castellar del Vallès. The club purchased the former vineyards in 1967 and gradually expanded until acquiring 60 hectares. Construction began in January 1968 and the grounds were officially opened in 1969. In addition to hosting Copa del Rey and the Copa de la Reina tournaments, Can Salas and Atlètic Terrassa have also hosted international tournaments at their hockey stadium called the Estadi de Hockey Josep Marquès, including the 2006 Men's Hockey Champions Trophy and the 2010–11 Euro Hockey League Round 1 group stages.

Players

Current squad

Men's squad
Head coach: Xavier Gasol

Women's squad
Head coach: Jordi Flo

Notable players

Men's internationals
 

 
 Matthias Witthaus
 
 Johannes Mooij

Women's internationals
 
 Silvia Bonastre
 Celia Corres
 Nuria Olivé
 Georgina Oliva
 Esther Termens
 
 Sofía Maccari
 Ayelén Stepnik

Honours

Men
División de Honor
Winners (22): 1982–83, 1983–84, 1984–85, 1985–86, 1986–87, 1987–88, 1988–89, 1989–90, 1990–91, 1993–94, 1994–95, 1996–97, 2003–04, 2004–05, 2005–06, 2006–07, 2008–09, 2009–10, 2010–11, 2011–12, 2016–17, 2021–22
Runners-up (10): 1991–92, 1992–93, 1995–96, 1997–98, 1998–99, 1999–00, 2000–01, 2001–02, 2007–08, 2020–21
Copa del Rey
Winners (17): 1983–84, 1984–85, 1985–86, 1986–87, 1987–88, 1989–90, 1990–91, 1991–92, 1993–94, 1994–95, 1996–97, 2000–01, 2001–02, 2005–06, 2009–10, 2014–15, 2021–22
Euro Hockey League
Runners-up (1): 2021
EuroHockey Club Champions Cup
Winners (2): 1985, 1998
Runner-up (7): 1987, 1989, 1990, 1991, 1992, 2006, 2007
EuroHockey Cup Winners Cup
Winners (2): 1994, 2000
Catalonia Hockey Championship
Winners (17): 1979–80, 1982–83, 1984–85, 1985–86, 1986–87, 1987–88, 1988–89, 1989–90, 1990–91, 1992–93, 1994–95, 1995–96, 1996–97, 2002–03, 2003–04, 2004–05, 2020–21
EuroHockey Indoor Club Cup
Winners (1): 1999
Runners-up (2): 2002, 2010

Notes

Women
Catalonia Hockey Championship: 3
1988, 2007, 2009

References

 
Catalan field hockey clubs
1952 establishments in Spain
Field hockey clubs established in 1952
Sport in Terrassa